Sermide was a comune (municipality) in the Province of Mantua in the Italian region Lombardy, located about  southeast of Milan and about  southeast of Mantua. It is now a frazione of Sermide e Felonica since 2017.

References

Cities and towns in Lombardy